Rosas de otoño may refer to either of two Argentine films:
Rosas de otoño (1931 film)
Rosas de otoño (1943 film)